Phenylacetylindoles are a class of synthetic cannabinoids.

In the United States, all CB1 receptor agonists of the 3-phenylacetylindole class are Schedule I Controlled Substances.

See also
 Structural scheduling of synthetic cannabinoids

References